James Wilson (April 28, 1779 – July 19, 1868) was a member of the U.S. House of Representatives from Pennsylvania.

James Wilson was born in Millerstown, Pennsylvania (now Fairfield).  He attended the common schools and learned the trade of cabinetmaker.  He engaged in mercantile pursuits and also interested in the real estate business.  He was a justice of the peace from 1811 to 1822.

Wilson was elected to the Eighteenth, Nineteenth, and Twentieth Congresses. He was again a justice of the peace from 1830 to 1859.  He died in Gettysburg, Pennsylvania.  Interment in Evergreen Cemetery.

Sources

The Political Graveyard

People from Gettysburg, Pennsylvania
1779 births
1868 deaths
Burials at Evergreen Cemetery (Adams County, Pennsylvania)
Democratic-Republican Party members of the United States House of Representatives from Pennsylvania
Jacksonian members of the United States House of Representatives from Pennsylvania
19th-century American politicians